Arhopala phaenops, is a butterfly in the family Lycaenidae. It was described by Cajetan Felder  and Rudolf Felder in 1865. It is found in the Indomalayan realm.

Subspecies
A. p. phaenops Philippines
A. p. detrita (Staudinger, 1889) Palawan
A. p. sandakani Druce, 1896 Borneo, Sumatra, Peninsular Malaya
A. p. termerion Fruhstorfer, 1914 Bazilan
A. p. aytonia Fruhstorfer, 1914 Java
A. p. buruensis Holland, 1900 Buru, Obi

References

External links
Arhopala Boisduval, 1832 at Markku Savela's Lepidoptera and Some Other Life Forms. Retrieved June 3, 2017.

Arhopala
Butterflies described in 1865